Bolshoye Pogorelovo is a rural locality (a village) in Shelotskoye Rural Settlement, Verkhovazhsky District, Vologda Oblast, Russia. The population was 15 as of 2002.

Geography 
Bolshoye Pogorelovo is located 57 km southwest of Verkhovazhye (the district's administrative centre) by road. Maloye Pogorelovo is the nearest rural locality.

References 

Rural localities in Verkhovazhsky District